Bromus erectus, commonly known as erect brome, upright brome or meadow brome, is a dense, course, tufted perennial grass. Like many brome grasses the plant is hairy. The specific epithet erectus is Latin, meaning "erect". The diploid number of the grass is 56.

Description
Bromus erectus is a perennial, tufted grass with basal tufts of cespitose leaves that is nonrhizomatous. The internodes are typically glabrous. The flattened cauline leaves have pubescent or glabrous sheaths. The grass lacks auricles and the ligule is blunt but finely serrated, sometimes with hairy edges. B. erectus flowers in June and July.

Range
Found on well-drained calcerous soils in disturbed areas, fields, and roadsides, B. erectus is widespread in Europe, South West Asia, North West Africa, and has been introduced into North America.

References

External links

erectus
Plants described in 1762
Flora of Europe
Flora of North Africa
Flora of Western Asia
Taxa named by William Hudson (botanist)